Midnight Killer is a 1986 Italian  giallo film starring Valeria D'Obici and Leonardo Treviglio, and directed by Lamberto Bava.

Plot
A mysterious serial killer murders the wife of a police officer, and the officer is suspected of the murder. Anna, a criminologist who is investigating the case of the legendary "Midnight Ripper" (a sex maniac who died years earlier) believes the policeman is innocent and suspects that the Ripper is still alive.

Cast

Production
Midnight Killer was Lamberto Bava's second giallo film and was initially developed as a television film. Bava later stated he was uneasy making these types of films, stating that "I find doing scenes where women get stabbed to death repugnant. Dario Argento does it so well, but I feel sick as soon as I see the knife in the murderer's hand"

Release
Midnight Killer was released in 1986. It was released on home video in Denmark as You'll Die at Midnight and in France as Midnight Horror.

Reception
From retrospective reviews, Italian film critic and historian Roberto Curti declared the film as "drab and hardly engrossing, with only sequences set in a hotel standing by the sea standing out."

References

Bibliography

External links
 

Films directed by Lamberto Bava
Films scored by Claudio Simonetti
Giallo films
Italian thriller films
1980s Italian films